Johanna Nurmimaa (born 11 May 1962) is a Finnish actress and singer.

Nurmimaa has acted in theatre and appeared in operas, mostly in soubrette and light lyric soprano roles. Her credits include Susanna in Le nozze di Figaro, Despina in Cosi fan tutte, and both Papagena and Pamina in The Magic Flute.

She has also played "Paula Sievinen" in the soap opera Salatut elämät, in 2004 to 2014. She has served as a voice actor for animated cartoons such as Snow White (Snow White), Pinocchio (Pinocchio), Sleeping Beauty (Aurora) and others.

References

1962 births
Living people
Finnish operatic sopranos
Finnish stage actresses
Finnish voice actresses
Finnish soap opera actresses